Gu Yaoyao (born 22 November 1995) is a Chinese rugby sevens player. She competed in the women's tournament at the 2020 Summer Olympics. She also represented China at the 2022 Rugby World Cup Sevens in Cape Town.

References

External links
 

1995 births
Living people
Female rugby sevens players
China international women's rugby sevens players
Olympic rugby sevens players of China
Rugby sevens players at the 2020 Summer Olympics
Place of birth missing (living people)
21st-century Chinese women